This list includes the biological mothers of Mughal emperors. There were nineteen emperors of the Mughal Empire in thirteen generations. Throughout the 331-year history of the Mughal Empire the emperors were all members of the same house, the house of Timurid.

References

Bibliography
 
 
 
 

 
Mughal